Wachau is an Austrian valley.

Wachau may also refer to:

 Wachau wine, an Austrian wine region
 Wachau, Saxony, a town in Germany
 Wachau, an area of Markkleeberg, Germany

See also
 Battle of Wachau, 1813